Hraunhafnartangi is the second northernmost point of mainland Iceland and was believed to be the northernmost point until 2016 when it lost that title to the close by Rifstangi which was found to exceed it by 68 metres. It is notable for the Hraunhafnartangi Lighthouse.

References 

Headlands of Iceland